D. D. Acholonu (born October 17, 1980 as Dilibe Chisamaga Acholonu) is a former Canadian football defensive end for the Montreal Alouettes of the Canadian Football League. He appeared in 12 games in 2006, recording 26 tackles, two sacks, and one pass deflection.

Fellow Washington State defender Will Derting described Acholonu as such in 2020:

References

External Links 
 D. D. Acholonu's Profile at NFL.com

1980 births
American football defensive ends
Canadian football defensive linemen
Players of Canadian football from Seattle
Players of American football from Seattle
Washington State Cougars football players
Montreal Alouettes players
Living people